Bratislav Ristić (born 1 April 1954) is a Yugoslav boxer. He competed in the men's featherweight event at the 1976 Summer Olympics. At the 1976 Summer Olympics, he defeated Mohamed Younes Naguib and Gustavo de la Cruz, before losing to Leszek Kosedowski.

References

External links
 

1954 births
Yugoslav male boxers
Olympic boxers of Yugoslavia
Boxers at the 1976 Summer Olympics
Place of birth missing (living people)
Living people
Mediterranean Games bronze medalists for Yugoslavia
Mediterranean Games medalists in boxing
Competitors at the 1979 Mediterranean Games
AIBA World Boxing Championships medalists
Featherweight boxers